The National Iranian American Council (NIAC) is a NGO based in Washington, D.C. The NIAC Action, the sister organization of NIAC, was formed in 2015 to build political power for Iranian Americans and utilizes grassroots advocacy, undertakes direct lobbying efforts in Washington DC, and engages political candidates to advocate NIAC's goals. Trita Parsi was one of the founders and is the organization's former president. Jamal Abdi, formerly NIAC's Vice President for Policy and Executive Director for NIAC Action, took over as president on August 1, 2018. NIAC is known for being in multiple controversies over claims of lobbying for the Islamic Republic.

Background
NIAC was founded in 2002 by Trita Parsi, Babak Talebi, and Farzin Illich to promote Iranian-American relations. Three years before that, Parsi co-authored a paper named "Iran-Americans: The bridge between two nations" which explained need of an organization like NIAC. NIAC advocates against war with Iran and advocated in support of the Iran nuclear deal.  The Congressional publication, The Hill, cited NIAC's work in support of the Iran nuclear accord as one of the "Top lobbying victories of 2015."

Sanctions 

A NIAC report concluded that U.S. sanctions on Iran cost the U.S. economy between $135 billion and $175 billion in lost export revenue between 1995 and 2012.  After the Iran nuclear deal was implemented and U.S. secondary sanctions on Iran were eased, the organization questioned the utility of the broad economic embargo the U.S. maintains on trade with Iran.

Lobbying for Iranian Students in the U.S. 

NIAC apparently has worked on behalf of Iranian students in the U.S. NIAC led the campaign to change the U.S.'s single-entry visa policy towards Iranian students, by allowing Iranian students to receive multiple entry visas to facilitate their travel to the country, a measure that the Obama administration adopted in 2011.

Efforts to save ancient Persian artifacts 
NIAC opposed efforts to confiscate ancient Persian artifacts from the University of Chicago, the Chicago Field Museum, Harvard University, and the Boston Museum of Fine Arts as part of court cases filed against the Iranian government. From 2006-2018, NIAC fought against seizure of the Persepolis tablets in the media, the courts, the Congress, and the White House.

This included supporting legislative amendments to prevent the seizure of ancient Persian artifacts, calling directly on the White House to intervene to protect the Persepolis tablets, and submitting an amicus brief on behalf of the Iranian-American community to the court to ensure that the community's heritage is protected.

NIAC Action
NIAC's sister 501(c)4 organization, NIAC Action, was formed in 2015 to support the nuclear deal between the U.S. and Iran and to champion Iranian American priorities.  At that time, NIAC Action assumed responsibility for and expanded direct and grassroots lobbying work previously conducted by NIAC.  NIAC Action's expressed advocacy goals are "to strengthen U.S. diplomacy with Iran to advance peace and human rights, promote greater openings between the American and the Iranian people, protect civil rights and opportunities for Iranian Americans at home, and support candidates who represent the Iranian American community's values."  Jamal Abdi currently serves as the organization's Executive Director.

Policy conference
Since 2011, NIAC has held an annual Leadership Conference that "aims to expose its attendees to world-class leaders, and to teach Iranian Americans how to gain the political strength needed to effect real change on the issues." The conference in 2015 included addresses from Sen. Chris Murphy (D-CT), as well as Representatives Donna Edwards (D-MD) and Dan Kildee (D-MI).

Lobbying controversy and defamation lawsuit
In 2007, Arizona-based Iranian-American journalist Hassan Daioleslam began publicly asserting that NIAC was lobbying on behalf of the Islamic Republic of Iran. In response, Parsi sued him for defamation. As a result of the lawsuit, many internal documents were released, which former Washington Times correspondent Eli Lake stated "raise questions" about whether the organization had violated U.S. lobbying regulations. Lake's article further mentions that “two lawyers who read some of the same documents said they did not provide enough evidence to conclude that Mr. Parsi was acting as a foreign agent.” NIAC responded that it is in "full compliance with all regulations and laws" and published all of its tax returns online to back up its claim. Andrew Sullivan responded to the story in The Atlantic, suggesting the motive of the story was to "smear" Parsi's reputation.

In September 2012, U.S. Federal District Court Judge John D. Bates threw out the libel suit against Daioleslam on the grounds that "NIAC and Parsi had failed to show evidence of actual malice, either that Daioeslam acted with knowledge the allegations he made were false or with reckless disregard about their accuracy." However, Judge Bates also noted that "nothing in this opinion should be construed as a finding that [Daioleslam's] articles were true. [Daioleslam] did not move for summary judgement on that ground, and it has not been addressed here." On April 9, 2013, Judge Bates ordered NIAC to cover a portion of Daioleslam's legal expenses.

Based on a 2015 Business Insider report, Judge John D. Bates rejected NIAC's lawsuit against Daioleslam, arguing that the NIAC's president work was "not inconsistent with the idea that he was first and foremost an advocate for the regime." The judge came to the conclusion that it is reasonable to rationally assert that NIAC is lobbying on behalf of the Iranian government.

A March 2015 column by Eli Lake in Bloomberg View asserted that the emails showed cooperation between Parsi and the then Iran ambassador to the United Nations and current Foreign Minister Mohammad Javad Zarif. NIAC's webpage confirms “that Parsi developed a relationship with Zarif after interviewing him on “numerous occasions for his book.” It states that Parsi made introductions for members of the U.S. Congress to meet with Zarif at the request of the lawmakers. According to The Washington Time's article, "Law enforcement experts who reviewed some of the documents, which were made available to The Times by the defendant in the suit, say e-mails between Mr. Parsi and Iran’s ambassador to the United Nations at the time, Javad Zarif - and an internal review of the Lobbying Disclosure Act - offer evidence that the group has operated as an undeclared lobby and may be guilty of violating tax laws, the Foreign Agents Registration Act and lobbying disclosure laws."

Funding
According to NIAC, "over 10,000 individual donors make up the core of NIAC’s support and provide the overwhelming majority of our funding every year." NIAC also receives funding from American philanthropic foundations such as the Ploughshares Fund and Rockefeller Brothers Fund. NIAC states that it does not receive funding from the U.S. or Iranian governments.

Demonstration against NIAC

In July 2019, some members of the Iranian community in the United States organized a demonstration in front of NIAC office in Washington DC. They believed NIAC is "the representative of the corrupt and brutal Islamic Republic regime" and not the voice of the Iranian-Americans. In response, a NIAC staff member appeared on BBC Persian and expressed support for free speech and described the protesters as supporters of the Donald Trump administration's policies toward Iran.

Iranians who were protesting for Regime Change believe that NIAC has not joined the Women, Life , Freedom Movement and is still looking for a way to reform by trying to reestablish the JCPOA deal.

Republican Senators' call to investigate NIAC
In January 2020, three Republican senators Tom Cotton, Ted Cruz and Mike Braun claimed that NIAC and its sister organization NIAC Action have violated the Foreign Agents Registration Act (FARA) and they are "amplifying regime propaganda in the United States". They requested the US Attorney-General William Barr to "evaluate whether an investigation of NIAC is warranted for potential FARA violations and to ensure transparency regarding foreign attempts to influence the US political process." In response to the letter, dozens of academics, policy professionals, activists, former senior U.S. officials and non-governmental organizations signed a statement denouncing the Senators' letter and expressing solidarity with and support for NIAC.

Recognized members
Among its affiliated people, it is possible to mention Trita Parsi and Jamal Abdi who served as the leader of the organization. Moreover several active reporters on Iranian topics including Negar Mortazavi are affiliated with this organization.

See also
 AIPAC
 Quincy Institute

References

External links
 
 NIAC Action Website of NIAC's sister advocacy organization
 tritaparsi.com Trita Parsi's website

Iranian-American culture in Washington, D.C.
Iranian-American organizations
Iran–United States relations
Foreign policy political advocacy groups in the United States
501(c)(3) organizations
2002 establishments in Washington, D.C.